Hiera, also known as Iera or Ira (Ίρα), was a town of ancient Lesbos.

The site of Hiera is located near modern Perama.

References

Populated places in the ancient Aegean islands
Former populated places in Greece
Ancient Lesbos